The second season of The Final 1 premiered on MediaCorp Channel 5 on 5 July 2015. It is a Singaporean reality-singing competition programme created by the director of Hype Records Ken Lim. It was won by Jermaine Leong.

Taufik Batisah and Lim returned for their second season as judges, and were joined by new judge Jaclyn Victor who replaced Kit Chan. Chan later returned to the show as a guest judge while Victor was away for her maternity leave. Season one's runner-up Shaun Jansen joined the show as the host.

Similar to the previous season, the winner would receive a cash prize and a management contract worth $100,000.

Show changes
On 30 June 2015, it was announced via a promotional video of the show that returning judges Taufik Batisah and Ken Lim would be serving on the judging panel for the second season. Season one judge Kit Chan did not appear in the video, and therefore was ruled out of returning to the show. It was not announced whether the show would bring in a third judge to replace Chan, though the season began with only Batisah and Lim as the judges for the first two episodes. On the third episode, it was announced by Lim that the show would be bringing in a third and final judge for the season, and revealed to be Jaclyn Victor.

Vanessa Vanderstraaten and Mike Kasem did not return to host the second season. They were replaced by Shaun Jansen, who was only officially introduced by Lim and made his first appearance in the seventh episode.

In this season, a few major changes to the format of the show was made. Contrary to the previous season, the public would not be allowed to vote for their favourites and play a part in deciding the contestants to advance in the competition. The judges would instead be the ones making the decision to eliminate contestants from the competition to ensure those "getting through to the next round will be only purely on [their] vocals and talent". The public would only be allowed to cast their votes when the competition is left with the final two contestants to decide on the winner.

Unlike the previous season where the show was mainly taped at the MediaCorp TV Theatre, most of the competition rounds would be recorded at The Ground Theatre at *SCAPE this season. In addition, apart from the final three episodes which would be shown live, all episodes would be pre-recorded and the results shows were discontinued. Results from the previous week would only be revealed during the following week's show.

The upper age limit for the contestants is reduced to 26 in this season (down from 32 the last season), which brings the eligible age-range to 16 to 26 years old.

Online and regional auditions
The show is open to all citizens and permanent residents of Singapore aged 16 to 26 as of 1 January 2015. The online auditions began on 22 February 2015 and ended on 20 March 2015 at noon. To participate in the auditions, all contestants must register themselves at the official website of the show and submit an audition video of no more than three minutes long. Over 1,000 audition clips were submitted for the competition.

Auditionees who have submitted their online video were later invited to attend a face-to-face audition session conducted by the producers. The producers auditions were conducted in all of the five Community Development Council (CDC) districts in Singapore, with the contestants attending the one in the area they reside in. The audition sessions at the Central and South West districts were also opened for walk-in auditionees who did not register themselves for the online auditions.

At the end of the regional auditions, the producers shortlisted a group of potential contestants for the judges, Batisah and Lim, who then selected 12 males and 12 females to advance to the next round of the competition as the final 24.

Top 24 finalists
The following is a list of top 24 finalists who failed to reach the top 16 rounds:

Top 24 rounds
The top 24 finalists were separated by gender, and performed in groups of four for the first round. The groups and song choices were all chosen by the producers. The second round involved solo performances, with the judges selecting contestants they were uncertain of moving on to the next round to perform again. After this round, the judges eliminated two contestants from each of the gender groups.

The judges later announced they have to eliminate more contestants from the remaining 20, and called out the bottom 3 contestants of each gender group. The contestants who were not called out were declared safe, and each of them had to pick one contestant from the opposite gender group to advance with them to the final 16. Two contestants (one from each gender group) were saved from elimination via majority votes by their fellow contestants, and the rest were eliminated.

  The first five majority votes cast by Jermaine Leong, Ruth Mathews, Shanice Hedger, Odelle Sabrin and Eunice Png were all directed to Sam Driscoll. Lou Peixin and Charlene Su did not need to vote as there was already a majority.
  Priscilla Tan received two minority votes from Leon Neoh and Marcus Ng; Cheryl Lim received two minority votes from Bernard Dinata and Isaac Ong; and Farhanah Khan received three majority votes from Gareth Fernandez, Lee Wei Lun and Azhar Aziz.
  Toh Yi Fan, better known as Tzire, was credited on the show as "Y.Fan". The identity of "Y.Fan" was unknown at first, as he was not featured in the first episode and only appeared very briefly in wide shots during the group performance round. However, Toh confirmed his participation in the top 24 rounds, with an uploaded picture of himself with his fellow group members on Instagram.

Top 16 finalists
The following is a list of top 16 finalists who failed to reach the finals:

Top 16 rounds
The top 16 finalists were once again divided into two gender-separated groups, with the male group airing on 19 July 2015 and the female group airing on 26 July 2015. The top four males and top four females, along with the two wild card choices by the judges, advanced to the finals as the final 10.

Besides their performance, the top 16 contestants were also evaluated on their relatability to the audience. After the first six contestants of each gender group has performed, the two contestants with the highest score from the judges were sent straight through to the final 10. The competition then continued with last two contestants performing their songs, and the judges advanced two more contestants with the highest score to the finals.

Midway through the episode on 19 July 2015, Ken Lim introduced Malaysian singer and Malaysian Idol winner Jaclyn Victor as the third judge of the season.

Males – Relatability

Females – Relatability

Wild Card round – Marketability
Following those eight contestants advancing on 19 and 26 July 2015, the remaining eight top 16 finalists competed in the Wild Card round for the final two spots in the top 10. The contestants were put to the test of their marketability as an artiste in the entertainment industry. To showcase their ability to sing in at least two languages, all contestants performed an ethnic song of their choice. Following another performance by each Wild Card contender, the judges selected two contestants, regardless of gender, to advance to the final group of 10. The episode was aired on 2 August 2015.

Finalists
The following is a list of top 10 finalists:

Finals
The finals began its airing on 9 August. In this season, there are eight weeks of the finals (the top 10 and top 9 weeks were shown together in a single episode) and 10 finalists, with one finalist eliminated per week based on the judges' scores (with the exception of the top 8  week, where the judges eliminated two contestants). The results shows were discontinued, and results from the previous week would only be revealed during the following week's show. Therefore, all the contestants from the previous week would turn up for the performance show on the following week, but only the ones that are safe from elimination would get to perform.

Each of the episodes would come with a theme, which are all in relation to the contestants' development as an artiste. Hence, apart from their usual performances, the contestants were also assessed on the exercises that they were tasked to complete each week, all based on the respective weekly themes.

Shaun Jansen was officially introduced as the host of the season at the start of the top 8 performance show.

Top 10 – Identity
 Group performance: "A Sky Full of Stars"
This week, the contestants were tasked to build on their unique identity as a performer through makeup, hair and clothing style makeovers.

Top 9 – Pop Culture
This week, the contestants collaborated with students from Republic Polytechnic to create online viral videos exploring the pop culture.

Top 8 – Foundation
Each contestant paid tribute to their families and friends for their support, and performed a song as a dedication to them.

Owing to the judges unable to decide on the contestants to eliminate from the competition, the bottom 3 contestants were allowed to perform on the following week. Based on the final showdown performances, the judges voted to send one of the bottom 3 to the next round of the competition.

Judges' votes to save
 Batisah: Shanice Hedger – felt Hedger delivered the performance with "so much fire and conviction"
 Victor: Odelle Sabrin – gave no reason, but stated it was without a doubt that she had to save Sabrin
 Lim: Odelle Sabrin – stated his decision was based on who performed better in the final showdown

Top 6 – Sustainability
Guest mentors: Alison Leong & Georgina Chang
This week, the contestants were evaluated by the guest mentors on their sustainability in the entertainment industry via a questions-and-answers session. The judges have also chosen songs based on the theme "Classics" for the contestants to perform.

Owing to a tie in the judges' scores, the bottom 2 contestants were allowed to perform on the following week. Based on the final showdown performances, the judges voted to send one of the bottom 2 to the next round of the competition.

Judges' votes to save
 Lim: Lee Wei Lun – felt Lee did a better job in giving a "creative performance"
 Batisah: Azhar Aziz – went with the performance he felt more connected with
 Chan: Azhar Aziz – went with the performance that moved her

Top 5 (first week) – Sustainability
 Guest mentor: Zul Sutan
This week, besides evaluating the contestants' sustainability in the entertainment industry, guest mentor Zul Sutan provided guidance to the contestants on their performances during the rehearsals. Once again, the contestants performed songs based on the theme "Classics". Victor did not appear on the judging panel in this episode as she was away for her maternity leave, and was replaced by former judge Kit Chan who returned to the show as a guest judge.

Top 5 (second week) – Media
This week, the contestants were assessed on their interaction with the media via interviews with the practitioners. There were no eliminations based on the previous week's performances, as all top 5 contestants were allowed to sing their first song. The contestants were then ranked based on their performance of the first song, and the one with the lowest ranking was eliminated. The top 4 contestants also sang their second song after the announcement of the results as their victory song.

Top 4 – Production Numbers
 Group performance: "September" / "Shut Up and Dance"

Top 3 – Originality

Top 2 – Competitor's Previous Performance / Contestant's Choice / Winner's Single

Elimination chart

 Hedger received a vote from Batisah for her final showdown performance, while Dinata received none from any of the judges. Therefore, Hedger finished in seventh place, while Dinata finished in eighth.

Guest performances

References

2015 Singaporean television seasons